Oliver Meredith Boone Bulman (20 May 1902 – 18 February 1974) was a British palaeontologist. He was Woodwardian Professor of Geology at the University of Cambridge.

Early life
Oliver Bulman was born in Chelsea to artist Henry Herbert Bulman and his wife Beatrice Elizabeth Boone. He was the second of three children.

Education
Bulman went to Battersea Grammar School in 1910, but wishing to study geology, which the school did not teach, he became an evening, and later day, student at Chelsea Polytechnic. He gained a London University scholarship in 1920 and went to Imperial College to study geology and zoology. He graduated with a first class BSc in geology in 1923. Bulman went on to a PhD degree jointly with James Stubblefield on the lower Palaeozoic of the  Wrekin district, of Shropshire in 1926.

Awarded a senior studentship, he worked for a year on Permian amphibians with Walter Frederick Whittard and for two years at Sidney Sussex College, Cambridge, where he studied dendroid graptolites under Gertrude Lilian Elles. Work on the  Palaeontographical Society's monograph British Dendroid Graptolites (1927 and 1928) earned him a Cambridge PhD degree in 1928. He then worked as demonstrator at Imperial College and at Cambridge. He became reader in palaeozoology in 1944 and Woodwardian Professor of Geology in 1955.

Honours
Bulman was elected an FRS in 1940 and was president of the geology section of the British Association, the Palaeontological Association (1960–62), the Geological Society (1962–64), and the Palaeontographical Society (1971–74). The Geological Society awarded him the Lyell Medal in 1953.

Private life
In 1938 he married Marguerite Fearnsides, daughter of William Fearnsides, the professor of geology at Sheffield. They had a son and three daughters. He died at home in Cambridge in 1974, and was cremated.

References

Fellows of the Royal Society
1902 births
1974 deaths
Lyell Medal winners
People educated at Battersea Grammar School
British palaeontologists
Alumni of Imperial College London
Alumni of Sidney Sussex College, Cambridge
Woodwardian Professors of Geology